KCBB-LD, virtual channel 41 and UHF digital channel 19, is a low-powered HSN2-affiliated television station licensed to Boise, Idaho, United States. The station is owned by Cocola Broadcasting.

External links
Cocola Broadcasting

CBB-LD
Low-power television stations in the United States